This is a list of events in British radio during 1998.

Events

January
21 January – Capital FM mid morning presenter Steve Penk attracts national attention after making a prank call to 10 Downing Street in which he pretended to be William Hague and spoke to Prime Minister Tony Blair.

February
16 February – The PopMaster quiz segment of the Ken Bruce Show on BBC Radio 2 is first broadcast.

March
March – Andy Parfitt replaces Matthew Bannister as controller of Radio 1.

April
1 April – By way of an April Fool's stunt, Kix 96 breakfast show presenter Nic Tuff calls the then South African president Nelson Mandela pretending to be British prime minister Tony Blair.
4 April – BBC Radio 3's weekday breakfast programme On Air begins broadcasting at the weekend.
6 April – Extensive schedule changes are made to BBC Radio 4. These include an earlier start to the day – 5:30am instead of 6am – and an earlier, 6am, start to Today. Many long standing programmes are axed as part of the shake-up and arts magazine Kaleidoscope is replaced by Front Row.
12 April – A Sunday evening episode of The Archers is introduced.
13 April – After nearly 30 years on air, Dance Band Days is broadcast on BBC Radio 2 for the final time.
April – After just seven months on air, East Midlands station Radio 106 is rebranded as Century 106 and relaunched with a new team of presenters.

May
No events.

June
1 June – Capital Gold replaces South Coast Radio. 1998 also saw capital Gold rolling out in Birmingham and Kent, replacing Xtra AM and Invicta Supergold respectively.
June – Emap purchases London station Melody 105.4 FM.

July
9 July – The BBC unveils a new range of digital car stereos that will go on sale in August.

August
August – Virgin Radio launches a new Saturday afternoon football show called Rock 'n' Roll Football.

September
September – Kevin Greening leaves the Radio 1 breakfast show, leaving Zoë Ball as sole presenter. She continued to host the show until March 2000.

October
2 October – John Dunn presents his final drivetime show on Radio 2 after 22 years.
4 October – On Radio 2, David Jacobs presents Frank Sinatra: The Voice of the Century, a 13-part documentary about the life and career of Frank Sinatra. The series concludes on 27 December.
5 October – 
A major overhaul of the Radio 2 schedule sees many new faces joining the network, including the singer Katrina Leskanich and former Radio 1 presenter Lynn Parsons, who present overnight shows on weekdays and weekends respectively. Johnnie Walker also joins Radio 2 as a regular presenter hosting the afternoon drivetime show (Monday to Thursday). Sally Boazman becomes the station's first official traffic presenter.
One hour of Virgin Radio's breakfast show starts simulcasting on Sky One. When a track was played on the radio, viewers saw the song's video.
9 October – Des Lynam joins Radio 2 to present a weekly drivetime programme on Fridays.
12 October – Chris Moyles is promoted from the Early Breakfast show to present the Radio 1 Early Drive show, between 4pm and 5:45pm on weekdays (later being extended to 35:45pm). He replaced Dave Pearce, and was replaced on Early Breakfast by Scott Mills.

November
12 November – TalkCo Holdings, whose chairman and chief executive was former Sun Editor Kelvin MacKenzie, purchases Talk Radio.
19 November – Mellow 1557 closes and relaunches on FM as Dream 100.

December
 December – Melody Radio is renamed Magic 105.4 FM following the purchase of Melody Radio by Emap.

Unknown
BBC Local Radio stations start carrying BBC Radio 5 Live instead of the BBC World Service when they are not on air. Consequently, the station is heard regularly on FM for the first time, albeit only during overnight hours.

Station debuts
17 January – KMFM Thanet
1 March – Huddersfield FM
7 March – 
Isle of Wight Radio
Isles FM (Outer Hebrides, Scotland)
23 March – Star Radio (Cambridge and Ely)
27 March – 107 Crash FM
10 April – Arrow FM
18 May – 
Kestral FM
Active FM
25 May – Silk FM
6 June – Centre FM
14 June – Wave 105
15 August – QuayWest Radio
1 September – Wire FM
7 September – CAT FM
8 September – Century 105
5 October – Kingdom FM (Fife, Scotland)
7 October – Peak FM
18 October – Chelmer FM
1 November – Fosseway Radio
28 November – RNA Arbroath
29 November – The Falcon (Gloucestershire)
11 December – Champion FM (North Wales)
13 December – Rutland Radio

Closing this year

 31 May – Xtra AM (1989–1998)
 Unknown – South Coast Radio (1991–1998)
 Late 1998 – European Klassik Rock (1997–1998)

Programme debuts
 January – Scott Mills on BBC Radio 1 (1998–Present)
 4 March – World of Pub on BBC Radio 4 (1998–1999)
 9 April – Material World (1998–Present)
 11 April – The Archive Hour on BBC Radio 4 (1998–Present)
 19 April – Sunday Night at 10 on BBC Radio 2 (1998–2013)
 20 May – The Alan Davies Show on BBC Radio 4 (1998)
 2 July – Puzzle Panel on BBC Radio 4 (1998–2005)
 31 July – The Write Stuff on BBC Radio 4 (1998–2014)
 22 September – The 99p Challenge on BBC Radio 4 (1998–2004)
 26 September – The Now Show on BBC Radio 4 (1998–Present)
 4 October – Frank Sinatra: The Voice of the Century on BBC Radio 2 (1998)
 5 October – Drivetime with Johnnie Walker on BBC Radio 2 (1998–2006)
 9 October – Des Lynam on BBC Radio 2 (1998–1999)
 15 October – In Our Time on BBC Radio 4 (1998–Present)

Continuing radio programmes

1940s
 Sunday Half Hour (1940–2018)
 Desert Island Discs (1942–Present)
 Letter from America (1946–2004)
 Woman's Hour (1946–Present)
 A Book at Bedtime (1949–Present)

1950s
 The Archers (1950–Present)
 The Today Programme (1957–Present)
 Sing Something Simple (1959–2001)
 Your Hundred Best Tunes (1959–2007)

1960s
 Farming Today (1960–Present)
 In Touch (1961–Present)
 The World at One (1965–Present)
 The Official Chart (1967–Present)
 Just a Minute (1967–Present)
 The Living World (1968–Present)
 The Organist Entertains (1969–2018)

1970s
 PM (1970–Present)
 Start the Week (1970–Present)
 You and Yours (1970–Present)
 I'm Sorry I Haven't a Clue (1972–Present)
 Good Morning Scotland (1973–Present)
 Newsbeat (1973–Present)
 The News Huddlines (1975–2001)
 File on 4 (1977–Present)
 Money Box (1977–Present)
 The News Quiz (1977–Present)
 Feedback (1979–Present)
 The Food Programme (1979–Present)
 Science in Action (1979–Present)

1980s
 In Business (1983–Present)
 Sounds of the 60s (1983–Present)
 Loose Ends (1986–Present)

1990s
 The Moral Maze (1990–Present)
 Essential Selection (1991–Present)
 No Commitments (1992–2007)
 The Pepsi Chart (1993–2002)
 Wake Up to Wogan (1993–2009)
 Essential Mix (1993–Present)
 Up All Night (1994–Present)
 Wake Up to Money (1994–Present)
 Julie Enfield Investigates (1994–1999)
 Private Passions (1995–Present)
 Chambers (1996–1999)
 Parkinson's Sunday Supplement (1996–2007)
 The David Jacobs Collection (1996–2013)
 Blue Jam (1997–1999)
 Westway (1997–2005)

Ending this year
April –
 Breakaway (1979–1998)
 Kaleidoscope (1973–1998)
 27 December – Frank Sinatra: The Voice of the Century (1998)
 Unknown – Week Ending (1970–1998)

Deaths
 2 January – Frank Muir, comedy writer (born 1920)
 22 June – Benny Green, jazz saxophonist and radio presenter (born 1927)
 18 July – Betty Marsden, comedy actress (born 1919)
 4 August – Charles Maxwell, radio producer (born 1910)
 2 October – Ken Platt, Lancashire comedian (born 1921) 
 20 October – Frank Gillard, broadcaster and executive (born 1909)

See also 
 1998 in British music
 1998 in British television
 1998 in the United Kingdom
 List of British films of 1998

References

Sources

Radio
British Radio, 1998 In
Years in British radio